Moshannon may refer to the following locations in Pennsylvania:

Moshannon, Pennsylvania, a community in Centre County
Moshannon Creek, a tributary of the West Branch Susquehanna River

See also
Black Moshannon (disambiguation)